The following is a list of notable events and releases of the year 2001 in Norwegian music.

Events

January
 19 – The 20th annual Djangofestival started on Cosmopolite in Oslo, Norway (January 19 – 20).
 25 – The 4th Polarjazz started in Longyearbyen, Svalbard (January 25 – 28).

February
 2 – Kristiansund Opera Festival opened (February 2 – 17).
 22 – The annual By:Larm started in Trondheim, Norway (March 22 – 25).

March
 |16 – The Oslo Kirkemusikkfestival started in Oslo, Norway (March 16 – 25).

April
 6
 The 28th Vossajazz started at Voss, Norway (April 6 – 8).
 Stein Inge Brækhus was awarded Vossajazzprisen 2003.
 7 – Eldbjørg Raknes performs the commissioned work So much depends upon a red wheel barrow for Vossajazz.
 30 –  Ole Blues started in Bergen (April 30 – May 4).

May
 9 – The 12th MaiJazz started in Stavanger, Norway (May 9 – 13).
 23
 The 29th Nattjazz 2001 started in Bergen, Norway (May 23 – June 2).
The start of Bergen International Music Festival Festspillene i Bergen (May 23 – June 3).

June
 14 – Norwegian Wood started in Oslo, Norway (June 14 – 16).

July
 4 – The 37th Kongsberg Jazzfestival started in Kongsberg, Norway (July 4 – 7).
 16 – The 41st Moldejazz started in Molde, Norway (July 16 – 21).

August
 6 – The 16th Oslo Jazzfestival started in Oslo, Norway (August 6 – 12).
 8 – The 15th Sildajazz started in Haugesund, Norway (August 7 – 11).
 10 – The annual Øyafestivalen started in Oslo, Norway (August 10 – 11).
 17 – The Bergen International Chamber Music Festival started in Bergen, Norway (August 17 – 26.

September
 4 – The Trondheim Kammermusikk Festival started in Trondheim, Norway (September 4 – 9.

Oktober
 5 – The Ultima Oslo Contemporary Music Festival started in Oslo, Norway (Oktober 5 – 14).
 11 – The DølaJazz started in Lillehammer, Norway (Oktober 11 – 14).

November
 8 – The Trondheim Jazz Festival started in Trondheim, Norway (November 8 – 11).

December

Albums released

Unknown date

B
 Ketil Bjørnstad
 Grace (EmArcy Records), featuring Eivind Aarset, Arild Andersen, Jan Bang, Anneli Drecker, Trilok Gurtu, and Bendik Hofseth
 Before the Light (November Music), featuring Eivind Aarset, Nora Taksdal, and Kjetil Bjerkestrand
 Old (EmArcy Records)

E
 Jon Eberson
 Jazz For Men (Curling Legs), with Carl Morten Iversen
 Mind The Gap (Curling Legs), with Bjørnar Andresen and Paal Nilssen-Love

K
 Ola Kvernberg
 Violin (Hot Club Records)

S
 Kjersti Stubø
 My Shining Hour (Blue Jersey Records)

Deaths

April
 22 – Ludvig Nielsen, composer, choral conductor and organist at Nidarosdomen (born 1906).
 24 – Gro Anita Schønn, singer and actor (born 1950).

See also
 2001 in Norway
 Music of Norway
 Norway in the Eurovision Song Contest 2001
 2001 in jazz

References

 
Norwegian music
Norwegian
Music
2000s in Norwegian music